Jalitgeola (잘 있거라; Farewell) is a 1927 Korean film. The silent, black and white film was written, directed, produced, edited by and starred Na Woon-gyu (1902-1937). This was the first film from Na's own production company, Na Woon-gyu Productions, financed by Park Seung-pil, owner of the Danseongsa theater in Seoul. The film premiered at the Danseongsa theater in November 1927.

Plot
This film is a melodrama telling a story of greed and lust. It begins with millionaire Min Bum-shik's wife and a steward plotting Min's murder in order to collect his money. Rapes, murder and prison sentences follow in the convoluted plot.

Cast
 Kim Yeon-shil (Hong Ryeon)
 Joo Sam-son (Park Jeong-song)
 Jeon Ok (Hwang Soon-nyeo)
 Na Woon-gyu (Kyeong Ho)
 Park Jeong-seop (Soon-nyeo's father, Hwang Seon-dal)
 Yoon Bong-Chun
 Ahn In-ok (Park Cha-song)
 Park Gap-deuk

See also
 List of Korean-language films
 Cinema of Korea

References

External links 
 
 

1927 films
Pre-1948 Korean films
Korean silent films
Korean black-and-white films
Films about rape
Films directed by Na Woon-gyu